Roman Golian (born 30 July 1982) is a Slovak football player who last played for Persiba Balikpapan in the Indonesia Super League.

Career 

In December 2014, he signed with Persiba. Before joining Persiba, he played for Persela Lamongan, Arema Indonesia and FK LAFC Lučenec.

References

External links 
 

1982 births
Living people
Slovak footballers
Expatriate footballers in Indonesia
Liga 1 (Indonesia) players
Slovak expatriate footballers
Persela Lamongan players
Persiba Balikpapan players
Association football defenders